Amber Templemore-Finlayson and Katie Ellwood, collectively known as Bert and Bertie, respectively, are British film and television directors. They are best known for directing the film Troop Zero. They also directed a block of episodes for the Disney+ series Hawkeye and Our Flag Means Death.

Career 
Bert and Bertie met in 2005 in London when Bert was making a short film series to go along with The Getaway, and Bertie was the game's writer. Bertie used to work for Sony Computer Entertainment as an assistant producer and script consultant. Their first project was the short film Phobias. The two have also directed commercials for McDonald's.

In 2019, they directed the comedy-drama film Troop Zero. They were inspired to create the film after realizing the social and cultural impact the film could have on young girls, saying that they felt "there had never been a film about a group of young girls that go on an adventure to achieve something by working together and succeeding". They convinced producer Todd Black at Escape Artists to help them create the film. After being approved by Escape Artists, producer Ted Hope and his Amazon Originals team let them pitch the film. For the pitch, they created Birdie Scout manuals filled with ideas how to create the film. They also made a "rip-o-matic" of reference movies to give Amazon Studios a sense of "the comic yet emotional tone of the movie", and chose 20 images that defined the film they wanted to create.

In July 2020, it was announced they would direct a block of episodes for the Disney+ series Hawkeye, which premiered in November 2021.

In February 2021, it was announced that the two will direct Queen Bitch & The High Horse, a film about the largest municipal fraud in American history. Cate Blanchett and her production company Dirty Films will produce, along with New Republic Pictures.

In August 2022, it was announced that the duo have signed on to direct a feature film adaptation of the Disneyland attraction Big Thunder Mountain Railroad.

Personal life 
The two are from London, and are based in Los Angeles and London as of January 2019. Bert grew up in Johannesburg. Bertie grew up in Leicester, England. The two like to call themselves "the Berts".

Their influences include the Coen brothers, Guillermo del Toro, Jean-Pierre Jeunet, Marc Caro, and Tim Burton.

Filmography

Film

Television

Video games

Awards 

They were also named one of Varietys 2019 Directors to Watch.

References

External links 
 
 
 

British women film directors
British women screenwriters
English-language film directors
Screenwriting duos
Video game writers
Filmmaking duos
BAFTA winners (people)